The molecular formula C10H16N5O13P3 (molar mass: 507.18 g/mol) may refer to:

 Adenosine triphosphate (ATP)
 Deoxyguanosine triphosphate (dGTP)